The Pakistan national cricket team toured Australia in the 1983–84 season and played 5 Test matches against Australia. Australia won the series 2–0.

Test series summary

First Test

Second Test

Third Test

Fourth Test

Fifth Test

External sources
 CricketArchive – tour summaries

Annual reviews
 Playfair Cricket Annual 1984
 Wisden Cricketers' Almanack 1984

Further reading
 Chris Harte, A History of Australian Cricket, André Deutsch, 1993

1983 in Australian cricket
1983 in Pakistani cricket
1983–84 Australian cricket season
1984 in Australian cricket
1984 in Pakistani cricket
International cricket competitions from 1980–81 to 1985
1983-84